The Poland men's national squash team represents Poland in international squash team competitions, and is governed by Polish Squash Federation.

Current team
 Wojtek Nowisz
 Marcin Karwowski
 Przemyslaw Atras
 Lukasz Stachowski

Results

World Team Squash Championships

European Squash Team Championships

See also 
 Polish Squash Federation
 World Team Squash Championships

References 

Squash teams
Men's national squash teams
Squash
Men's sport in Poland
Squash in Poland